Frank L. Packard (June 11, 1866  October 26, 1923) was a prominent architect in Ohio. Many of his works were under the firm Yost & Packard, a company co-owned by Joseph W. Yost.

Life and career
Frank Lucius Packard was born June 11, 1866 in Delaware, Ohio to Alvaro Harrison Packard and Miranda (Black) Packard. He attended the Delaware public schools and worked as a drafter for local architect and engineer F. A. Gartner. He was further educated at the Ohio State University in Columbus and the Massachusetts Institute of Technology in Boston, graduating from the latter in 1887. After two years working for Babb, Cook & Willard in New York City, he returned to Columbus circa 1889 and opened his own office. In 1892 he merged his office with that of Joseph W. Yost, forming the firm of Yost & Packard. At that time both architects were engaged on major Ohio State University projects, Packard as architect of Hayes Hall and Yost as architect of Orton Hall. In 1900 the partnership was dissolved when Yost relocated to New York City. Packard worked as a private practitioner for the remainder of his life.

Packard was active in Republican politics and was well–connected to powerful Republican politicians, including Warren G. Harding. In 1903 Packard was responsible for the design of the large front porch of Harding's Marion residence, the Harding Home, from which he conducted his Front porch campaign in 1920. In 1922 Harding, as President, appointed Packard architect of the United States pavilion at the Independence Centenary International Exposition in Rio de Janeiro in Brazil. This building was designed to be reused as the United States Embassy to Brazil after the fair. Located on what is now Avenida Presidente Wilson, this original building was replaced by a new embassy, now the consulate, in 1952.

Packard joined the American Institute of Architects as a Fellow in 1895. He was among the founders of the Columbus Society of Architects in 1908 and AIA Columbus in 1913. For many years Packard was a member of the Board of Directors of the Columbus Chamber of Commerce. He was president of both organizations for the year 1919-20. At the end of his life Packard was at work on plans for the Columbus Civic Center. Following his death, Packard's associates at AIA Columbus organized the Allied Architects Association to complete the project.

Personal life
Packard was married in 1892 to Eva Lena Elliott of Columbus. They had no children. Packard died suddenly on October 26, 1923 at the age of 57.

He is buried in Green Lawn Cemetery in Columbus, Ohio.

Legacy
In his private practice, Packard was associated with several other professionals, including architect Ralph Snyder, engineer Edward F. Babbitt and superintendent Lorenzo D. Mathews. After Packard's seath these associates reorganized the firm as Snyder, Babbitt & Mathews. It became Snyder & Babbitt in 1925 and was dissolved in 1929. Ralph Snyder continued in private practice for at least a few years. Major works by these firms include the Columbus Dispatch Building, built in 1925, and the Huntington National Bank Building, built in 1926.

Many buildings designed by Packard, independently and with Yost, have been listed on the United States National Register of Historic Places. Others contribute to listed historic districts.

The three partners of Richards, McCarty & Bulford, the most prominent architecture firm in Columbus after Packard's death, all worked for Yost & Packard.

Projects

Yost & Packard

Individual projects

 Shepard Street School, 106 Short St, Gahanna, Ohio (1889, NRHP 1979)*
 Fair Avenue School, 1395 Fair Avenue, Columbus, Ohio (1890)
 Central High School (1862-1928) addition (1891)
 Frank L. Beam house, Mount Vernon, Ohio (1900–01)
 Clay County Courthouse (former), Main St, Clay, West Virginia (1902, NRHP 1979)
 Ellis Hall, Ohio University, Athens, Ohio (1902 et seq.)
 Huntington Chapel, Green Lawn Cemetery, Columbus, Ohio (1902)
 William C. Miller house, 473 Hudson Ave, Newark, Ohio (1902)
 Monnett Memorial M. E. Chapel, 999 OH–98, Bucyrus, Ohio (1902–04, NRHP 1986)
 Columbus Savings and Trust Building, 8 E Long St, Columbus, Ohio (1904–05, NRHP 1977)
 Charles H. Lindenberg house, 1234 E Broad St, Columbus, Ohio (1904, NRHP 1972)
 Scripps Hall, Ohio University, Athens, Ohio (1904)
 Bryn Du Mansion, 537 Jones Rd, Granville, Ohio (1905–08, NRHP 1982)
 Franklin County Memorial Hall, 280 E Broad St, Columbus, Ohio (1905–06)
 Robert H. Jeffrey house, 165 N Parkview Ave, Bexley, Ohio (1905)
 Capitol Trust Company Building, 8 E. Broad St., Columbus, Ohio (1906)
 Joseph F. Firestone House, 1266 East Broad Street, Columbus, Ohio (1906, demolished)
Columbus Gas and Fuel Company, 135 N. Front St., Columbus, Ohio (1906, demolished)
 East Broad Street Presbyterian Church alterations, 760 E Broad St, Columbus, Ohio (1907–08, NRHP 1987)
 Richard Caslow house, 116 E Columbus St, Canal Winchester, Ohio (1908)
 Alumni Hall, Miami University, Oxford, Ohio (1909–10)
 William H. Thomas house, 406 Duhring Ave, Bramwell, West Virginia (1909–12)
 Bishop Hall, Miami University, Oxford, Ohio (1911–12)
 Gordy Hall, Ohio University, Athens, Ohio (1911)
 Morton Hall, Ohio University, Athens, Ohio (1911, demolished)
 Brown Chapel, Muskingum University, New Concord, Ohio (1912)
 Mitchell Hall, Wilberforce University (former campus), Wilberforce, Ohio (1912, destroyed 1974)
 Putnam County Courthouse, 245 E Main St, Ottawa, Ohio (1912, NRHP 1974)
 Emery Hall, Wilberforce University (former campus), Wilberforce, Ohio (1913, NRHP 2005)
 Tupper Hall, Ohio University, Athens, Ohio (1913)
 Thomas C. Miller Public School, 2 Pennsylvania Ave, Fairmont, West Virginia (1914, NRHP 2013)
 Athletic Club of Columbus, 136 E Broad St, Columbus, Ohio (1915, NRHP 2011)
 Clark County Memorial Hall, 300 W Main St, Springfield, Ohio (1915–16, demolished 2010)
 Lindley Hall, Ohio University, Athens, Ohio (1915)
 Masonic Temple, 900 Market St, Parkersburg, West Virginia (1915, NRHP 1982)
 Holzer Hospital (former), 553 Second Ave, Gallipolis, Ohio (1916–17)
 Bundy Hall, Wilberforce University (former campus), Wilberforce, Ohio (1917, destroyed 1974)
 Parkersburg High School, 2101 Dudley Ave, Parkersburg, West Virginia (1917)
 Seneca Hotel, 367 E Broad St, Columbus, Ohio (1917, NRHP 1983)
 Montgomery Hall, Muskingum University, New Concord, Ohio (1921)
 O'Shaughnessy Dam, Glick Rd, Dublin, Ohio (1922–25, NRHP 1990)
 United States Embassy, Av Presidente Wilson 147, Rio de Janeiro, Brazil (1922, demolished)
 Bentley Hall, Ohio University, Athens, Ohio (1923–24)
 Blume High School additions (former), 409 S Blackhoof St, Wapakoneta, Ohio (1923–25, NRHP 1996)
 Granville Inn, 314 E Broadway, Granville, Ohio (1923–24)
 Hocking County Courthouse, 5 E Main St, Logan, Ohio (1923–25)
 North High School, 100 E Arcadia Ave, Columbus, Ohio (1923–24, NRHP 1987)
 Yuster Building, 150 E Broad St, Columbus, Ohio (1923–24, NRHP 2017)

Snyder, Babbitt & Mathews and Snyder & Babbitt
 Columbus Dispatch Building, 34 S 3rd St, Columbus, Ohio (1925)
 Huntington National Bank Building, 17 S High St, Columbus, Ohio (1926)

See also
 Architecture of Columbus, Ohio

Notes

References

Further reading
 Foster, Don. Packard's Architecture Left Mark On Delaware.
 Powers, Barbara. Frank L. Packard: Architectural Realities of a Midwestern Architect, Ohio History Connection.

External links

 Full list of Yost & Packard works

1866 births
1923 deaths
Architects from Columbus, Ohio
Burials at Green Lawn Cemetery (Columbus, Ohio)